Al Sawa'ed is a football club based in Benghazi, Libya.

Football clubs in Libya